The Guadalupe roundnose minnow (Dionda nigrotaeniata) is a species of ray-finned fish in the family Cyprinidae.
It is found in the Colorado and San Antonio Rivers in Texas.

References

Dionda
Freshwater fish of the United States
Fish described in 1880
Taxa named by Edward Drinker Cope